Mundani may refer to:
Mundani language
Mundani, Iran